Helcystogramma hapalyntis is a moth of the family Gelechiidae. It was described by Turner in 1919. It is found in Australia, Sri Lanka and India.

The wingspan is 10–12 mm. The forewings are pale ochreous, irregularly clouded with brownish and sprinkled with dark fuscous. The hindwings are pale grey.

References

hapalyntis
Moths described in 1911
Moths of Asia
Moths of Australia